The Canadian Soccer League Awards is an annual awards ceremony for several individual performances at the end of the season. The event was established in 1998, when the Canadian National Soccer League merged with the stillborn Ontario Professional Soccer League to form the Canadian Professional Soccer League. The ceremony has been traditionally held at awards banquet at the end of the season with the exception in 2008, 2009, and 2010 where they were given out before the CSL Championship final. In 2010, the league began distributing awards to the Second Division for the first time.

First Division awards

Most Valuable Player Award 

The league's MVP award.

Golden Boot Award

The Golden Boot is the league's leading scorer.

Goalkeeper of the Year Award

Defender of the Year Award

Rookie of the Year Award

Coach of the Year Award

Harry Paul Gauss Memorial Award 
First introduced in 2004 as the CPSL President's Award, but was renamed in 2006 in honor of Harry Gauss. The award is presented to the individual who has shown allegiance, commitment and support to the league and its member clubs.

Referee of the Year Award 
The Referee of the Year award is voted on by the CSL Referee Committee.

Fair Play and Respect Award  
The Fair Play and Respect Award is awarded to the club which, in the opinion of the CSL Discipline Committee, has demonstrated good discipline on the field of play and has exhibited a high level of respect for the game officials in the regular playing season

Media and Broadcaster Award  
The Media and Broadcaster Award is awarded to the individuals who have shown interest and loyalty in reporting CSL news and matches.

Second Division awards

Most Valuable Player Award 
The league's MVP award.

Golden Boot Award

Goalkeeper of the Year Award

Defender of the Year Award

Rookie of the Year Award

Coach of the Year Award

Awards by club

References